Waltz Time is a 1933 British musical film directed by Wilhelm Thiele and starring Evelyn Laye, Fritz Schulz and Gina Malo. It is an adaptation of the operetta Die Fledermaus by Johann Strauss II and Richard Genée.

It was made at the Lime Grove Studios. The film's sets were designed by Alfred Junge.

Cast
 Evelyn Laye as Rosalinde Eisenstein
 Fritz Schulz as Fritz Eisenstein
 Gina Malo as Adele
 Jay Laurier as Frosch
 Parry Jones as Alfred
 George Baker as Orlovsky
 Frank Titterton as Fiacre Driver
 Ivor Barnard as Falke
 D. A. Clarke-Smith as Meyer
 Edmund Breon as Judge Bauer

References

Bibliography
 Wood, Linda. British Films, 1927-1939. British Film Institute, 1986.

External links

1933 films
1933 musical films
British musical films
1930s English-language films
Films directed by Wilhelm Thiele
Operetta films
Films based on operettas
Films set in the 1890s
Films set in Vienna
British remakes of German films
Films shot at Lime Grove Studios
Gainsborough Pictures films
British black-and-white films
1930s British films